Clinidium beccarii is a species of ground beetle in the subfamily Rhysodinae. It was described by Antoine Henri Grouvelle in 1903. It is known from Hatam, New Guinea. It is named after the collector of the holotype, Odoardo Beccari.

References

Clinidium
Beetles of Oceania
Endemic fauna of New Guinea
Beetles described in 1903